Airinė Palšytė (born 13 July 1992) is a Lithuanian high jumper. She won the gold medal at the 2017 European Indoor Championships.

Personal life
Palšytė was born in Kaunas, Lithuania. Her father Aurimas Palšis was a professional basketball player.

In 1998, Palšytė enrolled at the Simono Stanevičiaus Secondary School in Vilnius. From 2006 to 2010, she studied at Žemyna's gymnasium, also in Vilnius. In 2010, she started studying business information management at Vilnius University, Faculty of Communications. After completing her undergraduate degree, she began her Master's studies at Vilnius University, Faculty of Economics (marketing and integrated communications). Her boyfriend is a Lithuanian sprinter (specialising in 60, 100 and 200 meters) Kostas Skrabulis.

Athletic career
At the 2008 Lithuanian Athletics Championships, Palšytė finished second and won her first senior national championships medal. At the 2010 Lithuanian Athletics Championships, she won her first national gold medal.

Palšytė competed at the Olympic Games in 2012, 2016, and 2021. She won the silver medal at the 2016 European Championships. She won the gold medal at the 2017 European Indoor Championships and the bronze medal at the 2019 European Indoor Championships.

Her personal best is 2.01 metres, achieved in March 2017 when she won gold at the European Indoor Championships. It was also a new national high jump record. Her personal best outdoors jump is 1.98 metres, achieved in both July and August 2014 in Kaunas and Eberstadt.

Achievements

References

External links

 
 
 
 

1992 births
Living people
Lithuanian female high jumpers
Sportspeople from Kaunas
Athletes (track and field) at the 2012 Summer Olympics
Athletes (track and field) at the 2016 Summer Olympics
Athletes (track and field) at the 2020 Summer Olympics
Olympic athletes of Lithuania
World Athletics Championships athletes for Lithuania
European Athletics Championships medalists
European Athletics Indoor Championships winners
Universiade medalists in athletics (track and field)
Universiade gold medalists for Lithuania
Universiade silver medalists for Lithuania
Universiade bronze medalists for Lithuania
Medalists at the 2011 Summer Universiade
Medalists at the 2015 Summer Universiade
Medalists at the 2017 Summer Universiade